David L. Cook (born November 11, 1968) is an American Christian country music singer, songwriter and comedian.

Born to Donnell and June (née Mercer) Cook, David is the oldest of six children. He has written more than 2,500 songs and has won multiple Emmy and Telly Awards. His song, "Drop that Rock", was featured on his album In the Middle of It All and garnered a Dove Award nomination for Christian Country Album of the Year in 1999.

In all of Cook's overseas recordings his surname is Cooke to distinguish it from his work in the United States. The male members of The Cook Family Singers have always used just their middle initials as a trademark, a trait beginning back in 1885 when the first such group was formed.

In 1990 Cook was diagnosed with a dissociative disorder and psychogenic amnesia reportedly brought on by an abusive father. In 1999 Cook's story was used as a lead story with The 700 Club.

Biography
Cook was born in Pascagoula, Mississippi; after two years, his family moved to Fort Lauderdale, Florida. Cook began his musical career at age five, singing with his family's group, The Cook Family Singers. After his parents' divorce, the group continued without Donnell, but in 1980, the group disbanded because of June's health issues. He continued singing both gospel and secular music.

Early life
Early in life, Cook was abused by his father, who had a severe drinking problem. While intoxicated, Cook's father reportedly became violent towards his family. After many years of this abuse Cook developed many psychological problems that ended up following him through to his life as an adult. He developed a severe dissociative disorder and psychogenic amnesia. He recalled having periods of "missing time" but never really understood the cause. In 1990, doctors finally diagnosed the disorders after Cook experienced what they thought was a severe stroke and was rushed to the Coral Springs Medical Hospital in Fort. Lauderdale.

He checked himself out of the hospital and disappeared from his Florida home and was found five months later in a Charlotte, North Carolina, hospital with similar health complaints. Cook had been around Charlotte for five months and no one realized there was anything wrong until he started developing stroke symptoms again. Doctors diagnosed his problems, which were not organic, and referred him to see the proper specialists. He claims to have had no recollection of leaving Florida, nor what he had done during his five months in Charlotte. When asked, he stated that, "It was like someone switching off a light and then switching it back on." Cook's story has been told through different media. The 700 Club did a full-length documentary about his life, which aired worldwide. Cook wrote a religious self-help book, Inspirational Words about the issues he overcame.

Health
On November 11, 2009, Cook was diagnosed with a parathyroid tumor in his neck. Doctors assessed that the tumor was pressing against his vocal cords making it virtually impossible for him to perform. He was treated at Vanderbilt University Medical Center.

Music

Cook's first solo Christian album, Come Follow Me, was released in 1985. The album was written and produced by singer/producer Frank X. Loconto, a former member of the group Lane Brothers. In 1986, he signed with the American Musical Academy of Arts Association (AMAAA), and released another album, Personal Feelings.

In 1997, Mountainview Records released Cook's album, In the Middle of it All, which earned him a Gospel Music Association Dove Award nomination for Christian Country Album of the Year in 1999. However, after a fallout with Mountainview records in 1999, he started his own record label, DLC Records. During this period Cook created a comedy character, named Mortermer Crabbottom, in the tradition of comedic Southern characters like Gomer Pyle.

Cook recorded an album in character, Split Personality, based on the life and times of Mortermer Crabbottom growing up in fictional Crabbottom USA. In 1998, the Country Gospel Music Association inducted Cook into its Hall of Fame, along with Loretta Lynn, Barbara Mandrell, Andy Griffith, Jody Miller and Lulu Roman.

In 2012 Cook co-wrote "Hands of Hope" with David Meece and Bruce Carroll. The song was fashioned along the same lines as "We Are the World", which featured many famous voices from the music industry. The song went number one on the charts and remained there for two weeks. The song was used as the theme song for Turning Point Centers for Domestic Violence. On May 5, 2012 NATAS announced that the song Hands of Hope garnered Cook, Meece and Carroll the Emmy nomination for best Arrangement/Composer of a television theme song.

In 2021, Cook in partnership with Skip Martin the lead singer of the group Kool and the Gang recorded a version of the classic Curtis Mayfield song, People Get Ready. Martin approached Cook and requested he lend his voice to the project along with fellow artists, AZ Yet, The Dazz Band, Doug E. Fresh, Taylor Dayne, Howard Hewitt, John P. Kee, Steve Perry, Ray Parker Jr., Cece Peniston, Tony Terry, Neal McCoy and Stevie Wonder. All of the artists donated their talent to help raise awareness and funds for St. Judes Children's Research Hospital.

Television
In August 2007, Cook joined in partnership with the Firebird Arts Alliance. He was asked by David Tang, the president of Firebird, to write and produce a theme song for the television series New South Crossings. The theme song was "Meet Me at the Crossroads". Cook won an Emmy Award on January 24, 2009 for his work on the series audio and soundtrack.

Cook appeared in an episode, "Master Class", in which Cook worked with younger artists. He shows them the ins and outs of working together musically, and during the episode they perform the actual theme song for the series. On June 27, 2010, Cook won another Emmy award, this time for writing and singing the theme song, Meet Me at the Crossroads.

In August 2013, Cook began working on his new television series, Written N Black & White. He is listed as one of the stars of the show along with fellow comedian, Trina Jeffrie. The two play an interracial newlywed couple who are comedians and their parents are clueless of the marriage. Although the series is said to take place in New York, the actual taping is done in Fort Mill, South Carolina at the former PTL Studios, which had housed the Jim and Tammy Faye Bakker PTL network back in the 1980s.

Awards (Partial listing from 1997 to present)

In July 2006, the International Country Gospel Music Association inducted Cook and fellow artists, Mike Manuel, Gayla Earlene, Doug DeRamus and Marijohn Wilkin into the Hall of Fame.

In January 2009, Cook won his 5th Emmy Award for his work on the series, New South Crossings and he took home his sixth Emmy for the composing and arranging of "Meet Me at the Crossroads" in June 2010.

Cook was nominated on May 6, 2011 for three Emmy Awards for the documentary, The Award Goes To: A Look Back at the Legends, and at the June 18 telecast, he won his seventh Emmy for Outstanding Excellence in a Live Event.

In 2015 Cook hosted the Mississippi Music Awards and was given the Mississippi Marvel Award for his support of new musicians. During the 2015 AMG Heritage Awards, Cook was presented with a "Citation of Excellence" from the North Carolina Secretary of State, Elaine Marshall. The citation was given to Cook for the development of continued arts programing and mentoring he has implemented across the country.

Entrepreneurship
In 1988, Cook had incorporated Cook's Car Care Company in his native Fort Lauderdale. Eventually he transferred his interests to certain family members. The company is still in business today under different ownership. He incorporated Cook Productions International in 1989 with his business partner Edward Cook. Cook sold his interests in 1992, which dissolved the Florida division.

In 1999 Cook started DLC Records after leaving Mountainview Records due to contractual and other disputes. While on the label Cook took his 1999 project, In The Middle of it All, up the charts garnering several No. 1 singles, a Dove Award nomination and became the number one selling Christian country artists of all time. He incorporated Cook Enterprises to administer his contracts and personal business affairs, which included a children's television show development agreement with his management group, Five Star Music which produced a weekly show called, Crabbottom USA, taped at local television station, WHTV TV-39, a Nashville Tennessee based station.

In 2004, Cook was presented with the opportunity to become the CEO and controlling partner for the International Academy of Music Arts and Sciences (IAMAS Corporation). Years earlier, the company merged with its daughter company, The American Musical Academy of Arts Association, which proved profitable as there was an upswing in demand for Christian-based music and distribution opportunities. This was profitable as IAMAS was able to use its history in the entertainment industry as a door to help boost other smaller companies into existence. In 2004, the entertainment industry took a huge hit with the incoming markets of Napster, iTunes, and Amazon.com. IAMAS, no longer able to compete, decided to sell off only its American division and retain its overseas holdings. Since IAMAS Corporation had handled Cook's contracts since 1980, Cook offered to buy the company for an undisclosed amount. His offer was accepted and he officially filed for corporation status on November 24, 2004.

In 2005, Cook became the president of the Charlotte Civic Orchestra, a five year appointment. He retired from this position in 2010, and is no longer affiliated with the Charlotte Civic Orchestra. The organization is a 501(c)(3) company, and is entirely composed of volunteers. In January 2011, Cook and several others launched the Artists Music Guild, a network based company that connects artists with industry professionals who advise them and lead them in the proper course for career mapping. Cook is listed as the executive board president. On July 9, 2018 Cook purchased the Good Shepherd Funeral Home in Indian Trail which was once owned and ran by fellow Christian recording stars, Tony Greene and TaRanda Greene. The company was renamed Life and Legacy Funerals and Cremations.

After the retirement of longtime manager Mickey Hiter, Cook signed with Pink Hammer Entertainment out of Los Angeles, California in August 2012.

Artists Music Guild
Cook and other entertainment industry insiders started the Artists Music Guild in January 2011 to reduce the risks of artists being taken advantage of in a predatory industry.
On November 11, 2011, The Artists Music Guild held its inaugural convention at the historic Heritage USA complex. The inaugural convention was filmed for a PBS special, A Walk Through the History of Music in the United States, with more than 2000 people in attendance. Cook has stated that his main goal for making the Heritage USA the official home of the Artists Music Guild's convention was to heal the broken people who were affected by the fall of PTL. The convention reunited several of the former PTL Singers, including Toni Bogart, Brian Keith, Lee Young and Sandy and Russell Hosey. Also in attendance were many of the employees who lost their jobs amid the sexual and financial scandal which caused the fall of the Bakker's ministry. Cook posited that "by reuniting these individuals who have not performed together in over twenty plus years it would allow them to come together on their own terms and walk out of the complex without someone telling them they could never come back. It was the ultimate form of healing the hurts from the past." In 2015 the Guild became the parent company for the Mississippi Music Foundation in an effort to build a youth orchestra and a better outreach to educating and developing young and upcoming artists. Cook was added to the advisory board and became the official spokesperson and face of the foundation.

Rumor of Cook's death
On October 3, 2012, mainstream media reported that Cook had been killed in Winston-Salem, North Carolina after being struck by a car. Web crawlers picked up the story and the rumors went nationwide. The story was later confirmed to be that of a David Lee Cook, a North Carolina Department of Transportation worker who had been killed while removing a tree from the road during hazardous conditions. The original news organization released an explanation story after finding out of their mistake.

References

External links

 David L Cook Official Web Page
 [ All Music Group] Cook profile at allmusic.com
 Artists Music Guild Artists Music Guild Official Web Page

1968 births
Living people
American child musicians
Christian writers
American country singer-songwriters
Composers of Christian music
21st-century American comedians
21st-century American businesspeople
Assemblies of God people
American performers of Christian music
People from Pascagoula, Mississippi
Musicians from Fort Lauderdale, Florida
Writers from Fort Lauderdale, Florida
Singer-songwriters from Mississippi
Southern gospel performers
American Pentecostals
Emmy Award winners
Singer-songwriters from Florida
Country musicians from Mississippi
Country musicians from Florida